Sahib-ul-Ma'ali was a style used to address nobility during Egypt's last monarchical era.

Meaning
As it has no equivalent in English, Sahib-ul-Ma'ali is generally translated into English as "His Excellency." However, when literally translated from Arabic into English, Sahib-ul-Ma'ali means "His Excellency the Sublime Lord."

Eligibility
Holders of the Imtiaz noble rank, the third highest rank in the Royal Egyptian Court, were treated in the style of Sahib-ul-Ma'ali. Only holders of the Grand Cordon of Muhammad Ali, former Ministers of State, and eight other distinguished individuals could hold the Imtiaz rank at any given time. Those holding the Imtiaz rank also had the title of Pasha, their wives and daughters were given the title of Khanum, and their sons had the courtesy title of Bey.

Notable Titleholders

Boutros Ghali Pasha

Saad Zaghloul Pasha

Hussein Refki Pasha

Mostafa El-Nahas Pasha

Aly Maher Pasha

Ahmad Mahir Pasha

References

Styles (forms of address)
Noble titles of Egypt
African noble titles
African traditional governments